Verconia is a genus of sea slugs, dorid nudibranchs, shell-less marine gastropod mollusks in the family Chromodorididae.

The host sponges for species in this genus are sponges in the genera Darwinella and Dendrilla.

Noumea Risbec, 1928 (Mollusca: Gastropoda) is a junior homonym of Noumea Fauvel, 1874 (Arthropoda: Coleoptera), a name in current use. Verconia Pruvot-Fol, 1931 was recognized as a synonym of Noumea Risbec by Johnson & Gosliner (2012) and is here used for species of the chromodoridid group previously known as Noumea.

Species 
Species in the genus Verconia include:
 Verconia alboannulata Rudman, 1986
 Verconia aureopunctata Rudman, 1987
 Verconia catalai Rudman, 1990
 Verconia closeorum Rudman, 1986 
 Verconia decussata Risbec, 1928
 Verconia haliclona Burn, 1957 
 Verconia hongkongiensis Rudman, 1990
 Verconia laboutei Rudman, 1986
 Verconia nivalis Baba, 1937
 Verconia norba Marcus & Marcus, 1970
 Verconia parva (Baba, 1949)
 Verconia protea Gosliner, 1994
 Verconia purpurea Baba, 1949
 Verconia romeri Risbec, 1928 - type species
 Verconia simplex Pease, 1871
 Verconia spencerensis Rudman, 1987
 Verconia subnivalis Baba, 1987
 Verconia sudanica Rudman, 1985
 Verconia varians Pease, 1871
 Verconia verconiforma Rudman, 1995
 Verconia verconis Basedow & Hedley, 1905
 Species brought into synonymy:
 Noumea angustolutea Rudman, 1990: synonym of Ardeadoris angustolutea (Rudman, 1990)
 Noumea cameroni Burn, 1966: synonym of Verconia haliclona (Burn, 1957)
 Noumea closei Rudman, 1986: synonym of Verconia closeorum Rudman, 1986
 Noumea crocea Rudman, 1986: synonym of Diversidoris crocea (Rudman, 1986)
 Noumea flava (Eliot, 1904): synonym of Diversidoris flava (Eliot, 1904)
 Noumea margaretae Burn, 1966: synonym of Verconia haliclona (Burn, 1957)
 Noumea  regalis Ortea, Caballer & Moro, 2001: synonym of Chromodoris regalis (Ortea, Caballer & Moro, 2001)
 Noumea sulphurea Rudman, 1986: synonym of Diversidoris sulphurea (Rudman, 1986)
 Noumea violacea Risbec, 1930: synonym of Hallaxa indecora (Bergh, 1905)

References

Chromodorididae
Taxa named by Alice Pruvot-Fol